Arthur Henry Machell Cox (11 November 1870 – 1968) was an English ornithologist.

Cox was born in Hazelwood, Derbyshire, England, on 11 November 1870. He was educated at Trinity College, Cambridge, before working as a teacher and then headmaster at various schools in Devon. He contributed to ornithological research in Devon, was a founding member of the Devon Bird Watching and Preservation Society in 1928 and, from its inception in 1931, a member of the Cornwall Bird Watching and Preservation Society.

At one time he lived in Yelverton.

He died in 1968, by which time he had moved to Somerset.

References

Jenks, D., 1998. Birth of the Devon Bird Watching and Preservation Society. The Magazine of the Devon Bird Watching and Preservation Society, 51(3), pp. 3–20.
Jenks, D., 2004. A history of Devonshire ornithology: a review of the literature, events and personalities from prehistoric times to the end of the twentieth century, Falmouth: Isabelline Books.

1870 births
English ornithologists
1968 deaths
Alumni of Trinity College, Cambridge
People from Duffield
Schoolteachers from Devon